The Poppleton Building is an historic building in Portland, Oregon's Yamhill Historic District. The structure was completed in 1867. In 1873, it was destroyed in a large fire, along with the neighboring Pearne building and many other historic cast iron structures throughout Portland. Both the Pearne and Poppleton buildings were rebuilt using their original columns.

References

External links
 
 Poppleton Building at Emporis

1867 establishments in Oregon
Buildings and structures completed in 1867
Buildings and structures in Portland, Oregon
Southwest Portland, Oregon